is a Japanese footballer. He has previously played in Singapore's S.League for Albirex Niigata FC (Singapore).

Kosuke plays primarily as a central midfielder who can also be deployed in a wider position if required.

Club statistics 
Last update: 23 December 2014

References

External links
Contract with Kosuke Matsuda.
Announcement of Matsuda's release.

1991 births
Living people
Association football midfielders
Association football people from Shiga Prefecture
Japanese footballers
Kyoto Sangyo University alumni
Singapore Premier League players
Albirex Niigata Singapore FC players
Japan Football League players
MIO Biwako Shiga players
Expatriate footballers in Singapore